Lost in America is the third studio album by American progressive rock/AOR band Pavlov's Dog, released in 1990. Disbanded since 1977, Pavlov's Dog reformed in 1990 and recorded the album with only two original members, frontman David Surkamp and multi-instrumentalist Douglas Rayburn. The band's original guitarist Steve Scorfina and former percussionist Kirk Sarkisian appear as a guest musicians.

Track listing
All tracks credited to David Surkamp and Douglas Rayburn.

Personnel
All information according to the 2007 Rockville Music reissue liner notes

Pavlov's Dog
David Surkamp: vocals, guitar, twelve-string guitar
Douglas Rayburn: keyboards
Michele Isam: vocals, saxophone
Robert Lloyd: bass guitar
Frank Kriege: drums

Guest Musicians
Steve Scorfina: acoustic guitar on Lost in America and As Lovers Do
Kirk Sarkisian: drum treatments, additional percussion
Merry Adams: backing vocals on Brown Eyes
Lesslie Martin: power chords on Don't Rain on Me

Production
David Surkamp: direction, production
Douglas Rayburn: direction, production, recording engineering, audio mixing
Roby Petit: direction
Kurt Bujack: audio mixing, mixing engineering
Jim Loyd: mastering
Kathy Bosch: additional recording engineering
Patty Bosch: additional recording engineering
Steve Gotzier: additional recording engineering

Artwork
Bill Looderhose: cover art
Eugen Kern-Emden: art production
Steve Martin: photography

References

1990 albums
Pavlov's Dog (band) albums